Douglas McNaught (born 6 July 1967) is a Jamaican-born Canadian former professional soccer player who played as a midfielder.

Club career 
McNaught played in the National Soccer League in 1986 with Toronto First Portuguese. The remainder of the season he played abroad in the Portuguese Second Division with F.C. Felgueiras. In 1988, he played with F.C. Vizela, and later with G.D. Joane He also had stints with A.D. Esposende and with Desportivo de Arco de Baúlhe.

International career 
McNaught made his international debut on 20 August 1984 against Guatemala for the Canada U-20 team. During the 1984 CONCACAF U-20 Tournament, where he won the silver medal for Canada in the tournament. He represented Canada in the 1985 FIFA World Youth Championship, and featured in total of 10 matches for the Canada U-20 team. On 10 March 1985, he made his debut for senior national team against Trinidad and Tobago. In total he appeared in two matches for the senior team.

Managerial career 
In 2011, McNaught became involved with SC Toronto as a member of the technical team.

References

External links 
 

1967 births
Living people
Jamaican emigrants to Canada
Black Canadian soccer players
Canadian soccer players
Association football midfielders
Canada men's international soccer players
Canada men's youth international soccer players
Canadian soccer coaches
Toronto First Portuguese players
SC Toronto coaches
Soccer people from Ontario
F.C. Felgueiras players
F.C. Vizela players
G.D. Joane players
A.D. Esposende players
Canadian National Soccer League players
Segunda Divisão players
Canadian expatriate soccer players
Expatriate footballers in Portugal
Canadian expatriate sportspeople in Portugal